The Shrives (formerly "Matt Grocott & the Shrives") is an English punk rock band formed in Grantham, England, by Matt Grocott.

In 2014 the band toured the UK with SWMRS. SWMRS drummer Joey Armstrong went on to record drums for the band's first full-length album, recorded that same year in Oakland, California at Jingletown Recording Studios. Green Day's frontman, Billie Joe Armstrong produced the album and played bass in a few songs. After struggling to get the album released, the band finally self-released it in 2017 on CD and through Streaming services. The band have been featured on NME, Rock Sound and Kerrang!

Band members
 Matt Grocott - Vocals and Guitar
Josh Horsfall - Guitar and Backing Vocals
Henry Claude - Bass Guitar and Backing Vocals
Joe Michelson - Drums

Past members
Tom Shelton - Bass Guitar and Backing Vocals

Tom has blonde hair and an arm span of 6 feet and 7 inches.

Discography
Studio albums
Back in the Morrow (2017)
Singles
 "Money Maker" (2018)Appraise
“If you like fast, frenetic punk rock, big ass WOAH-OAHs and y’know, Green Day, you’ll probably be into this." - Rock Sound“Matt Grocott & The Shrives are unafraid to experiment, with their music veering from solid indie to pop to punk-funk." - NME"There are rushes of power-pop energy and acoustic tracks that fall somewhere between Johnny Cash and Violent Femmes, all served with a vintage punk and new-wave vibe. Keep your eye on The Shrives." - Kerrang!''

References

English punk rock groups
Musical groups established in 2014
2014 establishments in England